WYTR (88.1 FM) is a radio station licensed to Robbins, North Carolina.  The station broadcasts a Christian format and is owned by Athens Christian Radio, Inc.

References

External links

YTR
Radio stations established in 2013
2013 establishments in North Carolina